Enteromius cadenati is a species of ray-finned fish in the genus Enteromius which is endemic to the Konkouré basin in Guinea.

The fish is named in honor of ichthyologist Jean Cadenat (1908-1992), the Director of the Marine Biological Section of the Institut Français d’Afrique Noire, who collected one specimen of the fish in 1947.

Footnotes 

 

Enteromius
Taxa named by Jacques Daget
Fish described in 1962